Michel Wisdom Salomon Aka (born 1 October 1988 in Cotonou) is a Beninese international football player.

Career
Aka began his career by Soleil FC and was in July 2006 transferred to Slovak Superliga champion MŠK Žilina. He was a half year by MŠK Žilina, plays his first game and was than loaned out to FK Matador Púchov in January 2007. In the II.liga (Západ) by FK Matador Púchov was one and a half year, before turned back to Zilina. In July 2008 was than loaned out to FC ViOn Zlaté Moravce, who will play between 30 June 2009.

Club Valencia
He joined Maldivian club Valencia for the 2012 season. In his debut match, which was Valencia's first match of the 2012 Dhivehi League he started in the starting line-up. He also scored the match winning goal in the 71st minute of the game. Match ended as a 1–0 victory over the Club All Youth Linkage.

References

1988 births
Living people
Beninese footballers
Benin international footballers
MŠK Žilina players
FC ViOn Zlaté Moravce players
MŠK Púchov players
Slovak Super Liga players
Expatriate footballers in Slovakia
Beninese expatriate sportspeople in Slovakia
Club Valencia players
People from Cotonou
Association football forwards
Soleil FC players